Bazooka is a fictional character from the G.I. Joe: A Real American Hero toyline, comic books and animated series. He is the G.I. Joe Team's missile specialist and debuted in 1985.

Profile
His real name is David L. Katzenbogen, and his rank is that of sergeant. Bazooka was born in Hibbing, Minnesota.

He was operating as an Abrams tank driver in the 3rd Armored Division, when he came to believe that they were too vulnerable to rocket launcher fire. He put in for a transfer as soon as possible. Bazooka trained at the Advanced Infantry School, Fort Benning, Armor School, Fort Knox, and is a qualified expert with Dragon Anti-Tank Missile, Milan System, LAW rocket system, recoilless rifle, and all Warsaw Pact RPG systems. He is noted for being a swift, strategic thinker.

Toys
Bazooka was first released as an action figure in 1985. The figure was repainted and released as part of the Tiger Force line in 1988. A new version of Bazooka was released in 1993 as part of the Battle Corps line.

Another version was released in 2004 as "Sgt Bazooka", and packaged as the driver of the "Quickstrike" vehicle. This figure was repainted and released the same year without the vehicle, in a two-pack with Dreadnok Torch, as part of the Valor vs Venom line. In 2008, a new version of Sgt Bazooka was released, which was based heavily on the 1985 version.

Comics

Marvel Comics

In the Marvel Comics G.I. Joe series, he first appeared in issue #44 (February 1986). He is one of the many Joes to go underground after most of the team is arrested in order to cover up a public relations fiasco. The rogue Joes work to free General Hawk from murderous government agents who are holding him and another friendly general in a small clinic. Bazooka receives a minor bullet wound in the ensuing firefight. The entire Joe team is cleared of all charges.

Action Force
In the UK-based Action Force line of comics, Bazooka makes his debut fighting hand-to-hand with Crimson Guard forces. This is part of a Joe team effort to destroy a secret Cobra hideout using a fast food restaurant as cover. Later, he battles Dreadnoks Ripper and Buzzer over the possession of an experimental laser weapon, and with the assistance of an elderly war veteran, he acquires the weapon but the Dreadnoks escape. He later finds out the device is worthless.

Devil's Due Comics
During G.I. Joe's seven-year hiatus, Bazooka becomes overweight and is working as a security guard. In later issues, he works his way back into fighting condition and reunites with Alpine, Mutt and Rock 'n Roll. They have met up in Alpine's new hometown of Delhi Hills, and discover it is a hotspot of Cobra activity. In issue #16, Bazooka defeats Cobra's drill sergeant Big Boa in personal combat. Despite the large amount of destruction, mostly caused by Bazooka, there is no evidence of any enemy activity when Joe backup arrives. The foursome's veteran status is enough for them to be believed. Their reports are later verified, when an anonymous report leads to Cobra operatives in Delhi Hills being captured by a Joe team. Bazooka is later seen battling Cobra soldiers in Colombia.

IDW
Bazooka is a peripheral character in the 2010 IDW Publishing reboot of the G.I. Joe series. He, along with Scarlett and Duke, are tasked with a mission to protect Dr. Gerald Orizama from a Cobra abduction plot. During Black Out's extraction of the doctor, Bazooka is shot dead in a hallway. He is mourned by fellow Joes back at The Pit, with his trademark #14 football jersey framed and hung on the wall, while Stalker says a tribute to him.

Animated series

Sunbow series

Bazooka first appeared in the 1985 five-part miniseries "The Pyramid of Darkness". He is voiced by John Hostetter. He is usually paired with Alpine and portrayed as dullardly, often speaking in one-word sentences and being forgetful, as well as clumsy. Bazooka appeared frequently throughout the first season.

In the episode "Cobra Quake", Bazooka assists Quick Kick in training martial arts students in Japan and learns to disarm a bomb. Also in that episode, Cobra plans to destroy Tokyo with bombs that cause earthquakes, but is stopped by Bazooka, along with Quick Kick and his trainees.

In "Bazooka Saw a Sea Serpent", Bazooka sees a Cobra submarine in the form of a robotic sea serpent (much to the disbelief of the Joes), which becomes out of control. As the Joes attempt to stop it from attacking New York, Bazooka tricks the serpent into biting and destroying itself.

In "The Gods Below", Bazooka is among the Joes on a mission in Egypt, where Cobra seeks a treasure hidden in the temple of Osiris. While searching for a way out of the temple, the Joes face many traps and dead ends, some of which Bazooka tries to break through with rockets from his bazooka. Cobra Commander sends Crimson Guardsmen into the temple to investigate. The Joes defeat them and wear their uniforms, disguising themselves to fool Cobra. They accidentally lead Cobra Commander to the crown of Osiris, which Cobra was looking for. The Joes then enter a trial held by the Egyptian gods, during which the Joes return to the normal world.

Bazooka continued to appear in the second season, but as a background character.

G.I. Joe: The Movie
Bazooka plays a minor role in the 1987 animated film G.I. Joe: The Movie, when he, Alpine, and Gung-Ho are charged with guarding the captured Serpentor. Lt. Falcon is supposed to be guarding the front, but deserts his post, resulting in the three Joes being attacked by the Dreadnoks and incapacitated by Nemesis Enforcer.

G.I. Joe: Resolute
In an episode of G.I. Joe: Resolute, the USS Flagg suffers sabotage with multiple bombs going off. Its secure construction keeps it from sinking but there are still casualties. Bazooka, who is on security detail, is found murdered, without a mark on him. He was slain and hidden before the charges were planted. The culprit of both the bombing and Bazooka's murderer is revealed to be Storm Shadow. In Bazooka's mouth was a message addressed to Snake Eyes.

References

External links
 Bazooka at JMM's G.I. Joe Comics Home Page

Fictional characters from Minnesota
Fictional United States Army personnel
Fictional military sergeants
Fictional murdered people
Male characters in animated series
Male characters in comics
G.I. Joe soldiers
Television characters introduced in 1985